Mohammad Jahir Rayhan (born 25 April 2001) is a Bangladeshi Olympic athlete.

He competed at the 2019 Asian Athletics Championships, and the 2019 IAAF World Athletics Championships in Doha. He competed in the Athletics at the 2020 Summer Olympics – Men's 400 metres.

References

External links
 

2001 births
Living people
Athletes (track and field) at the 2020 Summer Olympics
Olympic athletes of Bangladesh
Bangladeshi male sprinters